Thomas Covered Bridge may refer to:
Oakachoy Covered Bridge in Alabama
Thomas Covered Bridge (Pennsylvania) in Indiana County